The following Missouri units and commanders fought in the Battle of Carthage of the American Civil War. The Union order of battle is listed separately.

Abbreviations used

Military rank
 MG = Major General
 BG = Brigadier General
 Col = Colonel
 Ltc = Lieutenant Colonel
 Maj = Major
 Cpt = Captain

Missouri State Guard
MG Sterling Price [not present]
Governor Claiborne F. Jackson
Col Lewis Henry Little, Adjutant General

Note:  Several independent cavalry units were attached to Rains' Eighth Division. Among these a contingent of 150 mounted troops under the command of Capt. Jo Shelby distinguished themselves on the vanguard of the Southern action throughout the battle. From daring battlefield maneuvers under fire by Sigel's batteries to pressing Sigel's retreat to Sarcoxie, Shelby's cavalry "snatched the victory at Carthage from Sigel's grasp." Altogether, the Missouri State Guard included over 2,000 unarmed men who did not participate in the battle.

See also

 Missouri in the American Civil War

References
 Hinze, David C. & Karen Farnham. The Battle of Carthage:  Border War in Southwest Missouri, July 5, 1861 (Campbell, CA:  Savas Publishing Company), 1997.  
 O'Flaherty, Daniel. Sutherland, Daniel E. General Jo Shelby: Undefeated Rebel. North Carolina: UNC Press. Pgs. 63-72: Boonville and Carthage. Jun 1, 2000. First Edition 1954.

American Civil War orders of battle
Missouri in the American Civil War